Tancey Clifford Arnold Wharton (1890 – before 1980) was an English footballer who played for Stoke.

Career
Wharton was born in Sunderland, Tyne and Wear and played amateur football with Seaham Harbour before joining Stoke in 1913. He played in 19 matches for Stoke during the 1913–14 season before joining Grantham.

Career statistics

References

1890 births
Year of death missing
Footballers from Sunderland
English footballers
Stoke City F.C. players
Grantham Town F.C. players
Southern Football League players
Association football midfielders